National Courts Administration may refer to:
 Norwegian National Courts Administration
 Swedish National Courts Administration